Solomon Jemuel Rayos Mercado (born May 6, 1984) is a Filipino-American former professional basketball player in the Philippine Basketball Association (PBA).

Professional career

Rain or Shine Elasto Painters
Mercado was originally drafted by the Alaska Aces as the fifth pick in the 2008 PBA draft. However, he was immediately traded to the Rain or Shine Elasto Painters, together with Eddie Laure for Joe Devance and the 2009 and 2010 second round picks of Alaska.

With all the focus on Gabe Norwood, that year's first pick overall, and not much hype he scored a record 29 points in his rookie debut game, the highest since Asi Taulava scored 32 points for Mobiline in his debut. Since then, he slowly became one of the PBA's elite point guards.

PBA Fiesta Conference 2009
If not for a hamstring injury that sidelined him in a couple of games into their semifinal series against the Barangay Ginebra Kings, Rain or Shine would have gone farther in the Fiesta Conference. A member of the All-Rookie Team, Mercado finished second to teammate Gabe Norwood for Rookie of the Year honors. Mercado emerged as the team's top scorer with 13.5 points per game and his 4.5 assists per night did not only lead the team but was also number 6 overall among locals. The only glitch in his rookie season was his 2.9 turnovers per game which ranked seventh overall and led the rookies in that category.

Sophomore Season (Philippine Cup)
He has been the team's cornerstone as he always led the Painters to winning games. Against the Coca-Cola Tigers in a knockout game, he scored 28 points to lead them. But unfortunately they would end up short after losing to the Purefoods Tender Juicy Giants.

PBA Fiesta Conference 2010
He averaged 17.7 points in the eliminations then had a 45-point outburst against the B-Meg Derby Ace Llamados. In another knock out game against the Tigers, he delivered crucial plays, despite fouling out, in a come from behind win. Against the Llamados in Game 3, he almost recorded a triple double with 16 points 15 assists 9 rebounds. But, in Game 5 of the series, they lost to the Llamados.

Meralco Bolts
Before the start of the 2011 PBA Commissioner's Cup, he and Jay-R Reyes were among the eight players involved in the three-way trade between Meralco, Rain or Shine and Air21 in what was easily one of the biggest trades that happened in that season. Mercado, along with Paolo Bugia were shipped to the Bolts for Beau Belga. He was still able to perform the same way he did with the Elasto Painters. However, it was not enough for the Bolts to past the eliminations of the latter conference.

GlobalPort Batang Pier
Before the start of the 2013 PBA Commissioner's Cup, he along with Kelly Nabong, Jaypee Belencion and Yousif Aljamal were traded to GlobalPort Batang Pier for Rey Guevarra, Vic Manuel, Josh Vanlandingham and 2015 first round pick.

San Miguel Beermen
Before the start of the 2014 PBA Commissioner's Cup, Mercado was traded to San Miguel in exchange for Alex Cabagnot.
At the start of 2014 PBA Governors' Cup, Mercado changed his jersey number from 0 to 7.

Return to GlobalPort
Before the 2014–15 PBA Philippine Cup trade deadline, just before the playoffs, Mercado was traded back to GlobalPort, together with San Miguel's 2018 and 2019 second round picks, in exchange for Cabagnot.

Barako Bull Energy
On January 8, 2015 Mercado was traded again by GlobalPort, this time to Barako Bull which gave up Denok Miranda and a 2016 second round pick.

Barangay Ginebra San Miguel
On May 4, 2015 before the start of 2015 PBA Governors' Cup Mercado was traded to Barangay Ginebra in exchange of Joseph Yeo. Mercado promised that he will do anything for Ginebra because he says he is in his best shape of his career. Mercado debuted for Barangay Ginebra on May 8, 2015 against the team that drafted him, the Alaska Aces, but his new team lost.

PBA career statistics

Season-by-season averages

|-
| align=left | 
| align=left | Rain or Shine
| 36 || 31.1 || .389 || .263 || .622 || 3.3 || 4.5 || .8 || .1 || 13.5
|-
| align=left | 
| align=left | Rain or Shine
| 46 || 34.5 || .413 || .315 || .683 || 3.8 || 4.6 || 1.2 || .2 || 16.7
|-
| align=left rowspan=2| 
| align=left | Rain or Shine
| rowspan=2|29 || rowspan=2|37.1 || rowspan=2|.393 || rowspan=2|.282 || rowspan=2|.592 || rowspan=2|5.0 || rowspan=2|4.8 || rowspan=2|1.1 || rowspan=2|.2 || rowspan=2|17.7
|-
| align=left | Meralco
|-
| align=left | 
| align=left | Meralco
| 37 || 31.5 || .384 || .266 || .551 || 3.6 || 3.8 || 1.1 || .3 || 13.6
|-
| align=left | 
| align=left | Meralco
| 37 || 35.5 || .393 || .272 || .691 || 3.6 || 6.9 || 1.0 || .2 || 16.2
|-
| align=left rowspan=2| 
| align=left | GlobalPort
| rowspan=2|33 || rowspan=2|30.6 || rowspan=2|.375 || rowspan=2|.191 || rowspan=2|.646 || rowspan=2|3.3 || rowspan=2|4.2 || rowspan=2|.6 || rowspan=2|.1 || rowspan=2|12.3
|-
| align=left | San Miguel
|-
| align=left rowspan=4| 
| align=left | San Miguel
| rowspan=4|33 || rowspan=4|26.7 || rowspan=4|.390 || rowspan=4|.200 || rowspan=4|.651 || rowspan=4|2.9 || rowspan=4|3.8 || rowspan=4|.7 || rowspan=4|.1 || rowspan=4|8.5
|-
| align=left | GlobalPort
|-
| align=left | Barako Bull
|-
| align=left | Barangay Ginebra
|-
| align=left | 
| align=left | Barangay Ginebra
| 48 || 25.0 || .410 || .324 || .565 || 2.7 || 3.2 || .5 || .1 || 8.1
|-
| align=left | 
| align=left | Barangay Ginebra
| 57 || 24.4 || .394 || .250 || .561 || 3.2 || 3.3 || .7 || .2 || 7.8
|-
| align=left | 
| align=left | Barangay Ginebra
| 44 || 20.6 || .408 || .321 || .625 || 2.4 || 2.5 || .8 || .3 || 6.5
|-
| align=left rowspan=2| 
| align=left | Barangay Ginebra
| rowspan=2|39 || rowspan=2|19.6 || rowspan=2|.415 || rowspan=2|.278 || rowspan=2|.535 || rowspan=2|2.6 || rowspan=2|2.6 || rowspan=2|.8 || rowspan=2|.2 || rowspan=2|5.5
|-
| align=left | NorthPort
|-
|-class=sortbottom
| align=center colspan=2 | Career
| 439 || 28.3 || .396 || .275 || .625 || 3.3 || 3.9 || .8 || .2 || 11.1

International career
Mercado is also a member of the Philippine National Basketball team, Smart Gilas. He was personally handpicked by Rajko Toroman alongside Kelly Williams and Asi Taulava. He played for the Philippines in the 2010 Asian Games and the 2012 William Jones Cup.

Philippine Team Statistics

|-
| align="left" | 2012 William Jones Cup
| align="left" | Smart Gilas
| 8 || 17.25 || .178 || 0.00 || .575 || 3.125 || 2.875 || 0.5 || 0.125 || 5.63

Personal life
Mercado is previously engaged to actress Denise Laurel. However, on October 20, 2016, a day after Ginebra won their first title after 8 years, Laurel announced through her Instagram account that they have ended their relationship.

References

1984 births
Living people
Barako Bull Energy players
Barangay Ginebra San Miguel players
Basketball players at the 2010 Asian Games
Basketball players from California
Biola Eagles men's basketball players
NorthPort Batang Pier players
Meralco Bolts players
Philippine Basketball Association All-Stars
Philippines men's national basketball team players
Filipino men's basketball players
Point guards
Rain or Shine Elasto Painters players
San Miguel Beermen players
Shooting guards
American men's basketball players
Asian Games competitors for the Philippines
Alaska Aces (PBA) draft picks
American sportspeople of Filipino descent
Citizens of the Philippines through descent
People from Yolo County, California